Bassano is a town in Alberta, Canada. It is also on the main line of the Canadian Pacific Railway. A short distance south of the town is the Bassano Dam (originally "Horse Shoe Bend Dam"), serves as a diversion structure which routes water through a canal into Lake Newell Reservoir which supplies water to the majority of the County of Newell for purposes like irrigation, recreation, and the County's drinking water.

The community has the name of Marquis de Bassano, a railroad promoter.

Demographics 

In the 2016 Census of Population conducted by Statistics Canada, the Town of Bassano recorded a population of 1,206 living in 536 of its 556 total private dwellings, a  change from its 2011 population of 1,282.

Infrastructure 

The town has emergency medical services provided by Bassano Health Centre.

Notable people 
Arno Doerksen, Member of the Legislative Assembly of Alberta for Strathmore-Brooks March 3, 2008 - April 23, 2012
Jim Henshaw – Canadian voice actor
Joseph B. Martin – Dean of Harvard Medical School 1997–2007
Mike Toth – Sportscaster

See also 
List of communities in Alberta
List of towns in Alberta

References

External links 

1909 establishments in Alberta
Towns in Alberta